Matthew Barton won the first edition of the event 6–2, 6–3 against James Ward.

Seeds

Draw

Finals

Top half

Bottom half

References
 Main Draw
 Qualifying Draw

Charles Sturt Adelaide International - Singles
2013 Singles
2013 in Australian tennis